Mark John Hayley Weedon (born 28 October 1940) is a former cricketer who played first-class cricket for Cambridge University in 1961 and 1962.

Weedon was born in Singapore after his mother had been evacuated from Hong Kong, where his father, Martin Pryce Weedon, was a captain in the Middlesex Regiment. His parents were separated and estranged during the Second World War, and later made new marriages.

He attended Harrow School before going up to Magdalene College, Cambridge. He played one full season for Cambridge in 1962, when he took 36 wickets with his medium-pace bowling and was noted for his perseverance. His best bowling figures came in the opening match of the 1962 season when he took 5 for 67 against Surrey.

After receiving an MA from Cambridge, Weedon earned an MBA from Harvard and began a career in business as a consultant and executive.

Weedon married Julie McLeod in 1971, and they have three children. He is a cousin of the actresses Hayley Mills and Juliet Mills. Their mothers were sisters.

References

External links
 
 Mark Weedon at CricketArchive

1940 births
Living people
Sportspeople from Singapore
People educated at Harrow School
Alumni of Magdalene College, Cambridge
English cricketers
Cambridge University cricketers
Harvard Business School alumni